Early street lights in New Zealand were first installed in major cities in the 1860s with Christchurch recording having 152 gas lamps throughout the city. With the shift to electric lights cities moved away from gas lamps and on to the incandescent lamps with the towns of Wellington (1889) and Reefton (early 1900s) becoming the first cities in the southern hemisphere to have electric street lights. Other towns soon followed suit with the town of Brightwater adding five and Richmond adding ten street lights in 1911. During the mid 20th century a move towards fluorescent lamps was taken up. Pressing into the 21st century New Zealand likemuch of the industrialized world has been expanding the installation of LED lights, and have seen large savings. In modern times communities in New Zealand have turned their street lights off for multiple reasons including to save energy and to help protect local wildlife in particular the Westland petrel as well as reduce light pollution.

Gallery

References 

Street lighting
Road infrastructure in New Zealand